Liezong is an imperial temple name for several Chinese monarchs. It may refer to:

Liu Cong (Han Zhao) (died 318), emperor of Han Zhao
Murong Bao (355–398), emperor of Later Yan
Emperor Xiaowu of Jin (362–396)

See also
Liezu (disambiguation)

Temple name disambiguation pages